The name Prince William (CVE-19) (earlier AVG-19 then ACV-19) was assigned to MC hull 198, a converted C3 laid down by the Western Pipe and Steel Company, San Francisco, California, 15 December 1941.

Designated for transfer to the Royal Navy under the Lend-Lease Agreement, she was renamed and launched as HMS Striker (D12), 7 May 1942; redesignated ACV-19, 20 August 1942; delivered to the United States Navy 28 April 1943; and transferred to the Royal Navy 18 May 1943. Redesignated CVE-19, on the US Navy List, 15 July 1943. During November and December 1944, she was in transit between Scotland and Australia with  ferrying Mosquito aircraft for use in the Far East Theatre. From March to August 1945 the ship was part of the British Pacific Fleet attached to the 30th Aircraft Carrier Squadron as its flagship. She served with the Royal Navy throughout the remainder of World War II.

She was returned to the US Navy, at Norfolk, on 12 February 1946 and struck from the Naval Register on 28 March 1946. The ship was then sold to the Patapsco Steel Scrap Co., Bethlehem, Pennsylvania, on 5 June 1948 and scrapped.

Design and description
There were eight s in service with the Royal Navy during the Second World War. They were built between 1941 and 1942 by Ingalls Shipbuilding and Western Pipe & Steel shipyards in the United States, both building four ships each.

The ships had a complement of 646 men and crew accommodation was different from the normal Royal Navy's arrangements. The separate messes no longer had to prepare their own food, as everything was cooked in the galley and served cafeteria style in a central dining area. They were also equipped with a modern laundry and a barbershop. The traditional hammocks were replaced by three-tier bunk beds, eighteen to a cabin which was hinged and could be tied up to provide extra space when not in use.

Aircraft facilities were a small combined bridge–flight control on the starboard side and above the  flight deck, two aircraft lifts , and nine arrestor wires. Aircraft could be housed in the  hangar below the flight deck. Armament comprised two 4"/50, 5"/38 or 5"/51  in single mounts, eight 40 mm anti-aircraft gun in twin mounts and twenty-one 20 mm anti-aircraft cannons in single or twin mounts. They had the capacity for up to eighteen aircraft which could be a mixture of Grumman Martlet, Hawker Sea Hurricane, Vought F4U Corsair fighter aircraft and Fairey Swordfish or Grumman Avenger anti-submarine aircraft.

References

Bibliography

External links

 

Type C3-S-A2 ships of the Royal Navy
Attacker-class escort carriers
Ships built in San Francisco
1942 ships
World War II aircraft carriers of the United Kingdom